This is the order of battle for the Battle of Vitoria (21 June 1813).

Abbreviations used

Military rank
 Gen = General
 Lt Gen = Lieutenant-General
 Maj Gen = Major-General 
 GD = général de division
 Brig Gen = Brigadier-General 
 GB = général de brigade
 Col = Colonel
 Lt Col = Lieutenant Colonel
 Maj = Major
 Capt = Captain
 Lt = Lieutenant

Other
 (w) = wounded
 (mw) = mortally wounded
 (k) = killed in action
 (c) = captured

Allied army 
Commander-in-Chief: Lt Gen (local General) Arthur Wellesley, 1st Marquess of Wellington

Total Allied Forces: 81,136 (68,222 infantry, 7,715 cavalry, 5,199 artillery and train)

Artillery: Lt Col Alexander Dickson (4,307 gunners and train, approx. 90 guns)

Reserve Artillery (Lt Col Julius Hartmann)
 Webber-Smith's Troop Royal Horse Artillery (RHA)
 Parker's Company Royal Artillery (RA)
 Arriaga's Portuguese Battery

Engineers: 892

Right Column 
Lt Gen Rowland Hill

Right Centre Column 

Lt Gen Lowry Cole

Left Centre Column 
Lt Gen George Ramsay, 9th Earl of Dalhousie

Left Column 
Lt Gen Thomas Graham

From Glover (2001), The Peninsular War, pp. 382-385 unless otherwise cited.

French Army 
Commander-in-Chief: King Joseph Bonaparte

Chief of Staff: Marshal Jean Baptiste Jourdan

French Army total: 69,212 (51,645 infantry, 11,002 cavalry, 6,565 artillery and train, 151 guns)

Army of the South 

GD Honoré Gazan

Army of the Centre 
GD Jean-Baptiste Drouet, Comte d'Erlon

Army of Portugal 
GD Honoré Charles Reille

King Joseph's Spanish Army 

From Fletcher (2005), Vittoria 1813, pp. 32-33 unless otherwise cited. 
|-
|}

Notes

References

 

Peninsular War orders of battle